World Poker Tour is a poker video game developed by Backbone Emeryville and Coresoft and published by 2K Sports for Game Boy Advance, PlayStation 2, and Xbox in 2005, and for PlayStation Portable in 2006. It is based on the World Poker Tour, an internationally televised gaming and entertainment brand.

Development
The game was showcased at E3 2005. Commentary in the game was provided by Mike Sexton and Vince Van Patten.

Reception

The game received "mixed or average reviews" on all platforms according to the review aggregation website Metacritic.

References

External links
 
 

2005 video games
2K Sports games
Coresoft games
Digital Eclipse games
Game Boy Advance games
PlayStation 2 games
PlayStation Portable games
Poker video games
Single-player video games
Video games developed in the United States
World Poker Tour
Xbox games